Cyperus ivohibensis is a species of sedge that is native to central and eastern parts of Madagascar.

See also 
 List of Cyperus species

References 

ivohibensis
Plants described in 1936
Endemic flora of Madagascar
Taxa named by Georg Kükenthal